Elburton Villa Football Club is a football club based in Elburton Village, Plymouth, England.

History
The club was established in 1982 as a successor to Elburton Red Triangle FC. They joined the Plymouth & District League and went on to win the Division One title in 1990–91. In 1992 the club were founder members of the Devon County League. The 1994–95 season saw the club win the league's Throgmorton Cup, beating Weston Mill Oak Villa in the final.

In 2007 the Devon County League merged with the South Western League to form the South West Peninsula League, with Elburton becoming members of the Premier Division. The club were relegated to Division One West after finishing bottom of the Premier Division in 2015–16. They were Division One West runners-up the following season. In 2017–18 the club finished third in Division One West and were promoted to the Premier Division in place of Stoke Gabriel, who had requested to be relegated. Following league reorganisation at the end of the 2018–19 season, they were placed in the Premier Division East.

Ground
The club play at Haye Road, opposite the King George V Playing Fields which had been home to Elburton Red Triangle. Floodlights and a 50-seat stand were installed during the 2012–13 season. The ground hosts a canteen hut, limited bar, changing rooms and toilet facilities.

Honours
Plymouth & District League
Division One champions 1990–91
Devon County League
Throgmorton Cup winners 1994–95

Records
Best FA Vase performance: Second round 2022–23

References

Football clubs in England
Football clubs in Devon
Association football clubs established in 1982
1982 establishments in England
Sport in Plymouth, Devon
Devon County League
South West Peninsula League